Pricelock provides fuel hedging for small and medium-sized enterprises, by bundling the smaller orders and purchasing gasoline and diesel futures contracts, contracts that trade in volumes of 21,000 gallons per month or more.

Company history 

Founded in 2006, Pricelock is headquartered in Redwood City, California. A deal with Chrysler in May 2008 guaranteed new-car buyers a gasoline price of $2.99 for three years.  While the deal didn't stop Chrysler from going into bankruptcy, it brought Pricelock 24,500 new customers, and led to a similar deal with Hyundai.  In March 2011, Pricelock raised over $12 million in second-round financing, and expects to be profitable by the end of 2012.

How Pricelock works

Companies select the number of gallons of gas or diesel they want to protect over a certain period and pick a protection price per gallon. If the national monthly average price of gas or diesel – as determined by the US Department of Energy – exceeds the customer’s protection price, Pricelock pays the difference. If the national monthly average price lands at or below the company’s protection price, the company does not receive a payout. Customers are not purchasing fuel from Pricelock and are not required to show receipts.

See also 
 Fuel hedging
 Fuel price risk management
 Fleet management

References

External links 
 

Companies based in Redwood City, California